Bargny (also, Bargny-Gouddau and Bargny Gouddou) is a settlement in Senegal.  It is located in a somewhat sheltered bay about 15 km to the east of the capital, Dakar.

Environment 
The community has a number of severe environmental threats, including coastal erosion and contamination from economic projects and industries in the community.

Industries

Cement 
The town holds one of the largest cement factories in West Africa. Created in 1984, the factory creates toxic dust which exposes local residents to contamination.

Transport 

Bargny is the site of a proposed deep water port for mineral exports, such as iron ore.

The railway following the coast from Dakar heads inland from this point to Thiès.

In 2016, construction of the Train Express Regional started.

Power 

A coal-fired power station, the Sendou power station, was opened in 2018.

Notable people
Abasse Ndione (1946-) -writer

See also 
 Railway stations in Senegal

References

External links 
 

Populated places in Thiès Region
Communes of Senegal